State Road 412 (NM 412) is a  state highway in the US state of New Mexico. NM 412's southern terminus is at the entrance to Bluewater Lake State Park, and the northern terminus is at Historic US 66 and NM 122 in Prewitt.

Major intersections

See also

References

412
Transportation in McKinley County, New Mexico
Transportation in Cibola County, New Mexico